The Varsity Blind Wine Tasting Match is a series of annual competitions in blind wine tasting  between the Oxford University Blind Wine Tasting Society and the Cambridge University Blind Wine Tasting Society; the blind wine tasting teams of  Edinburgh University and  St Andrews University; and the blind wine tasting teams of Bath University and Bristol University.  It is sponsored by Champagne house Pol Roger. The Oxford/Cambridge competition has run since 1953.  The current Oxford/Cambridge convenor is James Simpson,  Master of Wine (MW).  Will Lyons is a judge for the Edinburgh/St Andrews competition

The winning teams are invited to Épernay, France to visit the vineyards of Pol Roger and compete in an international tasting match against a French university.  The taster with the highest individual score wins a bottle of Pol Roger's top cuvee, Sir Winston Churchill.  The reserve taster with the higher score wins a subscription to Decanter Magazine.  The losing team each wins a bottle of Non Vintage Pol Roger.

Judges

For the Oxford v Cambridge competition there are two judges, one nominated by each team.  In 2008 and 2009, the Oxford judge was Jancis Robinson MW, and the Cambridge judge was Hugh Johnson.  Past judges have included Jasper Morris MW (who also judged in 2014). The papers are marked anonymously and cross-checked by both judges in order to ensure impartiality.

Winners 

Team Overall Competition Oxford v Cambridge

Cambridge (26 victories in total) including: 1994, 1998, 2004, 2005, 2007, 2009, 2010, 2011, 2014, 2019, 2020, 2022

Oxford (42 victories in total) including: 1992, 1993, 1995, 1996, 1997, 1999, 2000, 2001, 2002, 2003, 2006, 2008, 2012, 2013, 2015, 2016, 2017, 2018, 2021, 2023

Top Individual Tasters

2009: Caroline Conner (Ox)

2010: James Flewellen (Ox)

2011: James Flewellen (Ox), 152 points

2012: Ren Lim (Ox)

2013: Tom Arnold (Ox) and Stefan Kuppen (Cam), 140 points  [joint]

2014: Vaiva Imbrasaite (Cam), 195 points

2015: Swii Yii Lim and Yee Chuin Lim (both Ox) [joint]

2016: Qian (Janice) Wang (Ox), 173 points

2017: Jit Hang (Jackie) Ang (Ox), 143 points

2018: Neil Alacha (Ox), 160 points

2019: Emelyn Rude (Cam)

2020: Gianmarco Luppi (Ox)

2021: Yee Kwan Law (Ox)

2022: Emer Jones (Cam)

2023: Ian Cheung (Oxford)

References

External links
Reds, Whites and Varsity Blues, 60 Years of the Oxford & Cambridge Blind Wine-Tasting Competition
Report on the 2006 match from the Daily Telegraph, 1 April 2006
Report on the 58th Annual Varsity Wine Tasting Match, 2011
Report on the 59th Annual Varsity Wine Tasting Match, 2012
New York Times story on the 60th Annual Varsity Wine Tasting Match, 2013
The Drinks Business article on the match, 2013
The Drinks Business article on the match, 2014
Jancis Robinson match report and book review, 2014

Wine tasting
Wine-related events